Hemvadi (12 January 1892 – 17 October 1972), was the Princess of Siam (later Thailand). She was a member of Siamese Royal Family. She is a daughter of Chulalongkorn, King Rama V of Siam.

Her mother was The Noble Consort (Chao Chom Manda) Hem Amatayakul (daughter of Lord (Phraya) Dhammasarnniti Vichitbakdi). After she was born, she was given the name from her father as Mandhana Bhavadi. Later her father changed her name shorter into Hemvadi, on 8 January 1899, while she was 6 years old.

She lived in the Grand Palace all the rest of her life, and died on 17 October 1972, at the age of 80.

Royal Decorations
   Dame of The Most Illustrious Order of the Royal House of Chakri: received 9 May 1950
  Dame Cross of the Most Illustrious Order of Chula Chom Klao (First class): received 2 May 1950

Ancestry

References
 Royal Command changing name of Royal daughter Princess Mandhana Bhavadi into Hemvadi

1892 births
1972 deaths
19th-century Thai women
20th-century Thai women
19th-century Chakri dynasty
20th-century Chakri dynasty
Thai female Phra Ong Chao
Dames Grand Cross of the Order of Chula Chom Klao
Deaths from kidney disease
Children of Chulalongkorn
Daughters of kings